The 2021 British Grand Prix, officially the 2021 Müller Grand Prix Gateshead because of title sponsor Müller, was the 2021 edition of the annual outdoor track and field meeting in Gateshead, England. Held on 23 May at the Gateshead International Stadium, it was the first leg of the 2021 Diamond League – the highest level international track and field circuit. It was the first time the meeting was held in Gateshead instead of Birmingham since 2010, replacing the Rabat Diamond League which was cancelled because of the COVID-19 pandemic.

In addition to 14 Diamond League disciplines (7 men and 7 women), the first hour of competition included 100 metres and 200 metres sprint para-athletics events for both sexes, and a women's 400 metres hurdles event. Olympic champions, world champions, and world record holders had been announced to compete including Shelly-Ann Fraser-Pryce, Dina Asher-Smith, and Sha'Carri Richardson in the women's 100 metres.

Diamond League results
Athletes competing in the Diamond League disciplines earned extra compensation and points which went towards qualifying for the 2021 Diamond League final, held at the 2021 Weltklasse Zürich from 8–9 September. First place earned eight points, with each step down in place earning one less point than the previous, until no points were awarded in ninth place or lower.

Men

Women

Other results

References

Results
"Programme 2021 ". Diamond League (2021-05-23). Retrieved 2021-05-23.

External links
Diamond League – Gateshead Official Web Site

British Grand Prix (athletics)
British Grand Prix (athletics)
British Grand Prix (athletics)
Sport in Gateshead
Athletics competitions in England
British Grand Prix (athletics)